= Kappar =

Town in Balochistan, Pakistan

Coordinates: 25°17′N 62°43′E

Kappar is a small town on the southwestern coast of Balochistan, Pakistan. It suffered damage from flooding in 2007.
